Donald William Nicholson (August 11, 1888 – February 16, 1968) was an American politician from the state of Massachusetts.

Early life
Born in Wareham, Massachusetts, Nicholson attended the public schools and took college extension courses. He first worked as a salesman before serving in the United States Army during World War I from 1917 to 1919. He served in the 236th Prisoner of War Escort Company Army Service Corps and rose to the rank of sergeant.

Career 
Returning to Massachusetts, he entered politics and served as selectman, assessor, and overseer of the poor in Wareham from 1920 to 1925. He served as a delegate to all Republican state conventions from 1924 to 1947; served in the Massachusetts House of Representatives in 1925 and 1926; as a member of the Massachusetts Senate from 1926 to 1947, and as president of the state senate in 1946 and 1947. He was elected as a Republican to the Eightieth Congress to fill the vacancy caused by the death of United States Representative Charles L. Gifford, and reelected to the five succeeding Congresses (November 18, 1947 – January 3, 1959). Nicholson voted in favor of the Civil Rights Act of 1957.

Personal life 
Nicholson retired to his home in Wareham, remaining there until his death on February 16, 1968; he is buried in Center Cemetery.

In 1964 a bridge in Wareham was named after Nicholson.

See also
 Massachusetts legislature: 1925–1926, 1927–1928, 1929–1930, 1931–1932, 1933–1934, 1935–1936, 1937–1938, 1939, 1941–1942, 1943–1944, 1945–1946, 1947–1948

References

External links

1888 births
1968 deaths
United States Army personnel of World War I
Burials in Massachusetts
Republican Party Massachusetts state senators
Republican Party members of the Massachusetts House of Representatives
People from Wareham, Massachusetts
Presidents of the Massachusetts Senate
United States Army non-commissioned officers
Republican Party members of the United States House of Representatives from Massachusetts
20th-century American politicians